Lori McNeil and Helena Suková were the defending champions but only McNeil competed that year with Nicole Arendt.

Arendt and McNeil lost in the final 6–4, 3–6, 6–3 against Lisa Raymond and Rennae Stubbs.

Seeds
Champion seeds are indicated in bold text while text in italics indicates the round in which those seeds were eliminated.

 Lindsay Davenport /  Jana Novotná (semifinals)
 Mary Joe Fernández /  Chanda Rubin (quarterfinals)
 Gigi Fernández /  Conchita Martínez (first round)
 Nicole Arendt /  Lori McNeil (final)

Draw

External links
 1996 Advanta Championships of Philadelphia Doubles Draw

Advanta Championships of Philadelphia
1996 WTA Tour